John Danby (born 20 September 1983) is an English footballer who plays as a goalkeeper for Flint Mountain.

Danby played for much of his career at Chester City, and the subsequent phoenix club Chester, although he has also played for Kidderminster Harriers, Eastwood Town, Bradford Park Avenue and Connah's Quay Nomads.

Career
Born in Stoke, Danby spent five seasons with Kidderminster Harriers before signing for Chester City in 2006. Danby's time with Kidderminster saw them relegated out of The Football League in 2004–05 but he established himself as a promising young goalkeeper.

He went on to enjoy a successful 2006–07 season with Chester and was named the club's player of the season. Despite the signing of the experienced Gavin Ward, Danby was selected in goal for Chester's opening game of the 2007–08 season against Chesterfield. In two full seasons he did not miss any of Chester's competitive first–team matches, although he went off injured in a Football League Trophy tie against Crewe Alexandra in September 2007 and in a league match against Darlington in March 2008.

On 12 August 2009, Danby made his 128th consecutive start for Chester in The Football League at Barnet, to break a record set more than 40 years earlier by Mike Metcalf. But his hopes of completing a third successive season without missing a match were ended after he injured his shoulder at Notts County on 4 April 2009 and was ruled out for the remainder of the campaign. Therefore, Chester brought in James Spencer in on loan.

Following the expulsion of Chester City from the Conference in February 2010, he joined Eastwood Town in March 2010.

He later rejoined the phoenix club Chester on 9 June 2011 despite reported interest from three Football Conference sides. John became first choice goalkeeper in two consecutive Chester championships in Northern Premier League and Conference North. He started the third season as number one but fell out of favour midway through the campaign after manager Neil Young left the club. Later, Danby, whose contract was part-time, had been unable to train with the squad following the switch to daytime training for the 2014–15 season owing to his personal training business.

In September 2014 he joined Bradford Park Avenue.

Career honours
Chester City
Player of the Season: 2006–07.
Club record: Most consecutive Football League starts (133)

Chester FC
Non-League goalkeeper of the year 2011–12
Northern Premier League Winners 2011–12
Peter Swales Shield Winners 2012
Conference North Winners 2012–13

Connah's Quay Nomads
 Welsh Premier League Team of the Year: 2016–17, 2017–18

References

External links

1983 births
Living people
Footballers from Stoke-on-Trent
English footballers
Association football goalkeepers
Kidderminster Harriers F.C. players
Chester City F.C. players
Eastwood Town F.C. players
Chester F.C. players
English Football League players
National League (English football) players
Northern Premier League players
Bradford (Park Avenue) A.F.C. players
Connah's Quay Nomads F.C. players
Flint Town United F.C. players